Douglas Munro Grant (born July 27, 1948) is a Canadian retired professional ice hockey goaltender who played 77 games in the National Hockey League for the Detroit Red Wings and St. Louis Blues between 1973 and 1980. The rest of his career, which lasted from 1966 to 1982, was spent in various minor leagues.

Career
Grant played in the inaugural 1960 Quebec International Pee-Wee Hockey Tournament with Corner brook. He played in the Newfoundland Senior Hockey League for the Corner Brook Royals for five seasons as starting goaltender. In 1973-74, his first season in Detroit, he played 37 games, with 15 wins, 16 losses and two ties, with a goals against average of 4.16, and recorded one shutout. After that, Grant bounced between the NHL and the minor leagues, never playing more than 17 games another NHL season, and retired from hockey in 1982.

Career statistics

Regular season and playoffs

References

External links
 

1948 births
Living people
Canadian ice hockey goaltenders
Detroit Red Wings players
Fort Worth Wings players
Ice hockey people from Newfoundland and Labrador
Kansas City Blues players
New Haven Nighthawks players
People from Corner Brook
Salt Lake Golden Eagles (CHL) players
Undrafted National Hockey League players
Virginia Wings players